The Toyota H engine was first produced in 1967 but did not reach road cars till 1972. It is not a successor to the older and larger . 

H engine was then replaced by the 2H engine and the 12H-T turbo engine. It was succeeded by the more advanced SOHC HZ series engine.

H 
The H is a 3.6 L (3,576 cc) inline 6, 12-valve OHV diesel engine. Bore is 88 mm and stroke is 98 mm, with a compression ratio of 21:1.

Applications
 Toyota Land Cruiser HJ45
 Toyota Dyna HU15 HU30
 Toyota Weapon carrier HQ15

2H
The 2H is a 4.0 L (3,980 cc) inline 6, 12 valve OHV indirect injection diesel engine. Bore is 91 mm and stroke is 102 mm, with a compression ratio of 20.7:1. This engine weighs  in European trim from 1985.

Applications
 Toyota Land Cruiser HJ47, HJ60, HJ75
 Toyota Dyna HU20, 30, 40, 50
 Toyota Coaster HB20, 30

12H-T
The 12H-T is a 4.0 L (3,980 cc) inline 6, 12 valve OHV turbocharged direct injection diesel engine. Bore is 91 mm and stroke is 102 mm, with a compression ratio of 18.6:1. Output is 134 hp (100 kW) at 3500 rpm with 232 lb·ft (315 N·m) of torque at 1,800 rpm, on the stock configuration of 7PSI of boost.
 Toyota Land Cruiser HJ61
 Toyota Coaster HB20, 30

References

H
Diesel engines by model
Straight-six engines